Margie Liszt (March 2, 1909August 24, 1992) was an American actress. She made 37 television and movie appearances, including I Love Lucy and several Three Stooges films.

She died of colon cancer at the age of 83 at Laguna Hills, California.

Selected filmography

Life with Blondie (1945)
Blondie's Lucky Day (1946)
Side Street (1950)The Tooth Will Out (1951)Baby Sitters Jitters (1951)As You Were (1951)Grounds for Marriage (1951)Cause for Alarm! (1951)Valley of Fire (1951)We're Not Married! (1952)Income Tax Sappy (1954)Deep in My Heart (1954)Rawhide TV series, (1959-1965)Two Weeks in Another Town (1962)The Courtship of Eddie's Father (1963)Johnny Cool'' (1963)

References

External links
 

1909 births
1992 deaths
American television actresses
American film actresses
Actresses from New York (state)
Deaths from cancer in California
20th-century American actresses
Deaths from colorectal cancer